See also John Hewitt (disambiguation)
John Hewitt or Hewett (alias Weldon, alias Savell)
(date of birth unknown; executed at Mile End Green, 5 October 1588) was an English Roman Catholic priest. He is a Catholic martyr, beatified in 1929.

Life
His father was William Hewett, a draper of York. From Caius College, Cambridge, Hewttt passed to the English College, Reims, where, in 1583, he received minor orders.

In the summer of 1585 he went to York (possibly because of ill health), where he was captured and banished in September, reaching Reims once more in November, 1585. After his ordination he set out on 7 January 1586. He used the alias Weldon, and was disguised as the serving-man of John Gardiner, Esq. of Grove Place, Buckinghamshire. Sometime prior to March 1587, Hewitt/Weldon was arrested at their lodgings in Gray's Inn and sent to Newgate prison. There he met Nicholas Horner, a tailor who was imprisoned for having harbored priests. The irons had so injured Horner's leg that it had to be amputated; Hewitt assisted Horner during the procedure.   

In October, 1588, he was formally arraigned on a charge of obtaining ordination from the See of Rome and entering England to exercise the ministry. He was sentenced to death, and the day following was taken through the streets of London to Mile End Green, where he was hanged.

References

Attribution

The entry cites:
Richard Challoner, Memoirs of English Catholics, I (London, 1878)
Douay Diaries, ed. Thomas Francis Knox

1588 deaths
16th-century English Roman Catholic priests
English beatified people
16th-century venerated Christians
Alumni of Gonville and Caius College, Cambridge
Year of birth unknown
One Hundred and Seven Martyrs of England and Wales